Andrés Germán Bailo (born 6 September 1988) is an Argentine professional footballer who plays as a goalkeeper for Ferro Carril Oeste.

Career

Club
Colón were Bailo's first team. In 2008, he agreed a loan stint with Torneo Argentino B's Sportivo Belgrano. Bailo appeared thirty-two times for them, including in the play-offs, as they secured promotion up to Torneo Argentino A. His Colón debut subsequently arrived on 24 February 2013 during a defeat to Belgrano; he had previously been an unused substitute twenty-one times that season. Bailo featured in further fixtures with Estudiantes, Tigre, Argentinos Juniors and Independiente in 2012–13. After just one appearance across the following two seasons, Bailo left to rejoin Sportivo Belgrano on loan for a second time.

Bailo participated in twenty-six fixtures back with the club, with his last appearance arriving on 15 November 2015 versus Santamarina as Sportivo Belgrano's relegation to Torneo Federal A was confirmed. He departed Colón permanently on 31 August 2016, with Ferro Carril Oeste of Primera B Nacional completing the signing of Bailo. Forty appearances occurred in his opening campaign as they finished ninth.

International
In 2005, Bailo received a call-up to Argentina's squad for the South American U-17 Championship in Venezuela.

Career statistics
.

References

External links

1988 births
Living people
Footballers from Santa Fe, Argentina
Argentine footballers
Association football goalkeepers
Torneo Argentino B players
Argentine Primera División players
Primera Nacional players
Club Atlético Colón footballers
Sportivo Belgrano footballers
Ferro Carril Oeste footballers